Claudio Signorile (born 9 September 1937) is an Italian politician.

Biography
Claudio Signorile graduated with a degree in literature and taught Modern History at the Universities of Rome and Sassari, and Contemporary History at the University of Lecce. He was a member of the Italian Socialist Party (Partito Socialista Italiano; PSI) from 1956 to 1994, becoming national secretary of the Socialist Youth Federation (until 1965) and then, as a member of the National Party Directorate, deputy secretary of the party from 1978 to 1981.

Following the kidnap of the Christian Democrat politician Aldo Moro by the far-left terrorist group the Red Brigades (Brigate Rosse; BR) in March 1978, Signorile became involved in clandestine attempts to develop lines of communication between his party and BR, with the intention of securing Moro's release. Although always remaining within the confines of the law, Signorile contacted Marxist intellectuals sympathetic to BR, most notably Franco Piperno and Lanfranco Pace, and reported the outcomes of their discussions to the then leader of the PSI, Bettino Craxi. As Signorile later stated during the investigation into Moro's murder:

From 1981 to 1983, he was Minister for Extraordinary Interventions in the South in the Spadolini and Fanfani governments. From 1983 to 1987, he served as Minister of Transport in the governments led by Bettino Craxi. In 1988 he was one of the protagonists of the so-called "golden sheet scandal". He was accused together with his secretary Rocco Trane of having received bribes for 720 million lire for the award of a contract for the supply of linen destined for the sleeping cars of Ferrovie dello Stato, was indicted and subsequently acquitted in 1996.

In 1994 he was expelled from the PSI.

In 2004 Signorile founded the Socialist Unity movement, while in 2005 he joined the new radical-socialist project "Rose in the Fist".

In 2007 he joined the Reformist Alliance of Ottaviano Del Turco, to promote the participation of a group of socialists in the constituent phase of the Democratic Party.

References

External links

1937 births
Living people
People from Bari
Italian Socialist Party politicians
Italian Democratic Socialists politicians
Deputies of Legislature VI of Italy
Deputies of Legislature VII of Italy
Deputies of Legislature VIII of Italy
Deputies of Legislature IX of Italy
Deputies of Legislature X of Italy
Deputies of Legislature XI of Italy
Politicians of Apulia